White City Stadium was a greyhound racing and speedway stadium in Old Trafford, Greater Manchester, England.

Origins

Construction
Manchester is synonymous with greyhound racing because Belle Vue Stadium became the first greyhound track in the United Kingdom and Ireland to hold oval course racing in 1926. One year later on 1 November 1927 the remaining eleven acres out of a sixteen-acre plot of land belonging to the Royal Botanical Gardens was sold to Canine Sports Ltd and a stadium was speedily constructed. The stadium in the Old Trafford area was south of the Chester Road tramway and north of Talbot Road.

Opening
The first meeting took place on 28 May 1928 followed by speedway on 16 June 1928. The circuit circumference was listed as 448⅔ yards with distances of 500, 525, 700 and 725 yards behind an 'Inside Sumner' hare system. The circuit was described as having wide well banked turns.

Pre war history
One of the first track trainers was J. Madden who trained Loose Card to victory in the 1929 Scurry Gold Cup and just one year later the Greyhound Racing Association (GRA) purchased the stadium. The GRA owned multiple tracks including Belle Vue.

White City struggled to match the popularity of Belle Vue and another rival track the Audenshaw Greyhound Racing and Sports Ground started in racing in 1932. In June of the same year a greyhound called Wild Woolley was propelled to national fame when winning the English Greyhound Derby for White City trainer Jack Rimmer and owner Sam Johnson. Wild Woolley defeated the legendary Mick the Miller and Future Cutlet by a neck in the final. The following year Future Cutlet became the Derby champion and Wild Woolley finished third place despite being the favourite on this occasion.

The principal pre-war event was the Wilkinson Memorial Challenge Cup and amenities at the track included a home straight Grand Enclosure that offered catering and licensed bar facilities in the Members club. Starting from the back straight was the Popular Enclosure which continued around the third and fourth bends. The kennel facilities were at sister track Belle Vue and contained 320 electrically heated kennels situated well behind the first and second bends of the Belle Vue circuit. The fact that the greyhounds were housed at Belle Vue meant that the trainers at the time were attached both to Belle Vue and White City.

Post war history

After the war business boomed and totalisator turnover in 1946 was £1,878,980. A Derby final appearance by a greyhound called Lacken Invader was trained by L. Hague.

A new Racing Manager (RM) by the name of Charlie Birch took control during the 1950s and a new cinder track being installed for athletics in 1953. In 1959 Birch was replaced by R W Payne after Birch moved to Harringay Stadium. Payne was in turn replaced by A W Williams. In 1960 the Cock O’the North, a major race was inaugurated and six years later the Manchester Cup was switched from sister track Belle Vue. Stan Mitchell a recent training addition from Perry Barr Stadium trained Barrys Shamrock when he won the first running of the Manchester Cup at White City in 1966.

The trainers supplying runners in the 1960s were Stan Mitchell, Wilf France, Percy Stagg, W Holland, G England and Bill Adams. In the early 1970s three new trainers Eddie Moore, Harry Bamford and Ron Saunders joined. In 1971 the experiment by the GRA to introduce eight dog races went into full swing with trials at Harringay and racing at Belle Vue and White City.

Eddie Moore's Myrtown, a dark brindle dog finished runner up to Jimsun in the 1974 English Greyhound Derby and one year later he made the 1975 English Greyhound Derby final again. Trainers continued to join the track in the late 1970s George Barnett and Jack Hurt were two such trainers, the latter experienced success with a greyhound called Kilbelin Ruler and Hurt had arrived from Preston Greyhound Stadium in 1977.

Speedway

Dirt track racing started on Saturday 16 June 1928 and finished in 1930 but was revived for a meeting in 1958.

Stock car racing
The stadium started to host BriSCA Formula 1 Stock Cars run by Mike Parker Promotions in 1972. The track was originally a very bumpy shale surface, but was tarmaced in 1976. The BriSCA Formula 1 Stock Cars World Championship World Final race was held twice at White City. In 1976 the race was won by Stuart Bamforth, and in 1979 by Frankie Wainman. The racing continued until the end of the 1981 season. A tarmac track was laid down for MPP Promotions, which improved the bumpy shale track.

Closure
Later R Thomas became RM assisted by Ian Travis but the GRA Property Trust which was an offshoot of the GRA were actively selling large city sites and White City fell into that category.

The stadium was sold to developers during 1981 and the stadium closed during 1982. A few years later it was demolished to make way for the retail park. The white colonnaded entrance gateway in Chester Road remains.

Competitions

Cock o' the North

Manchester Cup

(1958-65 Belle Vue), (1966–81 White City Manchester)

Track records
Pre-metric
	

Post-metric

References

Defunct greyhound racing venues in the United Kingdom
Defunct speedway venues in England
Defunct sports venues in Greater Manchester
History of sport in Manchester